Anatoly Budayev (31 March 1969 – 18 July 2013) was a Belarusian footballer. He spent the majority of his career at Shakhtyor Soligorsk, which he helped to win the champions title in 2005 and Belarusian Cup in 2004 and which he also captained from 2004 until 2005.

After retirement Budayev worked at Belaruskali. He died on 18 July 2013.

Honours
Shakhtyor Soligorsk
 Belarusian Premier League champion: 2005
 Belarusian Cup winner: 2003–04

References

External links
 Player profile at BATE website
 

1969 births
2013 deaths
Belarusian footballers
FC Torpedo-BelAZ Zhodino players
FC BATE Borisov players
FC Shakhtyor Soligorsk players
Association football defenders
People from Barysaw
Sportspeople from Minsk Region